New Zealand political leader Norman Kirk assembled a "shadow cabinet" system amongst the Labour caucus following his elevation to become Leader of the Opposition in 1965. However, he found it challenging to avoid it being composed mainly of Auckland and Christchurch MPs.

As the Labour Party formed the largest party not in government, the frontbench team was as a result the Official Opposition of the New Zealand House of Representatives.

Frontbench team
The list below contains a list of Kirk's spokespeople and their respective roles:

Notes

References

New Zealand Labour Party
Kirk, Norman
1965 establishments in New Zealand
1972 disestablishments in New Zealand